WASP-7b is an extrasolar planet discovered in 2008. This 5-day period planet is slightly smaller than Jupiter, roughly the same mass and more dense.

A study in 2012, utilizing the Rossiter–McLaughlin effect, determined the planetary orbit is strongly misaligned with the equatorial plane of the star, with misalignment equal to 86°, making the planetary orbit nearly polar. The orbit is also slightly eccentric, which is surprising given the tidal circularization timescale of below 650 million years.

Physical properties
The measured temperature on the planetary dayside is 1393 K. Sodium was detected in the planetary atmosphere in 2022.

See also
 SuperWASP

References

External links

WASP Planets

Exoplanets discovered by WASP
Exoplanets discovered in 2008
Giant planets
Hot Jupiters
Transiting exoplanets
Microscopium